The Brown Citrus Aphid, (Toxoptera aurantii), is an aphid in the superfamily Aphidoidea in the order Hemiptera. It is a true bug and sucks sap from plants. It is known to hosts in well over 150+ plant species.

References 

 
 
 
 
 

Agricultural pest insects
Aphidini